Jordan Valley Medical Center West Valley Campus is a community hospital located in West Valley City, Utah, United States. While it is a separate hospital, it is considered a "campus" of the Jordan Valley Medical Center. The hospital offers general medical and surgical care, general intensive care, cardiac intensive care, a cardiology department, pediatric medical and surgical care, obstetrics, an orthopedics department, and a 25-bed emergency department.

Jordan Valley Medical Center West Valley Campus has 101 licensed beds. It opened in 1964, under the name Valley West Hospital. The current owner, Iasis Healthcare LLC., bought the hospital in 1999. The CEO is Steven M. Anderson.

See also
 List of hospitals in Utah

References

External links
 

Hospital buildings completed in 1964
Hospitals in Salt Lake County, Utah
Buildings and structures in West Valley City, Utah